Tovarníky is a municipality in the Topoľčany District of the Nitra Region, Slovakia. Formerly, it was a part of Topoľčany, later the village became independent.

History 
The village of Tovarníky is historically documented in the years 1172 - 1196. It belonged to the monastery of Zobor, from 1272 as Taarnuk Ab, later to the manor of Topoľčany. In 1600 - 1610 a manor house was built in this village, whose last owner before nationalization was the Stummer family. After the demise of Topoľčany Castle at the beginning of the 17th century, the administration of the Topoľčany manor was moved to Tovarník. In 1833-34 a sugar factory was built. In 1869, the Stummers built a new sugar factory here, which worked until 1929 when it burnt down. There were two mills in the village, also a brewery (founded in 1866), a distillery (1865) and two lighthouses. In the past the village was annexed to Topoľčany, now it is again an independent village.

References

External links 
Official homepage 

Villages and municipalities in Topoľčany District